Scoot Danough is a former guitarist for Bleeding Through. Scott appeared on the albums Dust to Ashes, Portrait of the Goddess, This Is Love, This Is Murderous, and The Truth. In 2013, Scott rejoined Bleeding Through for their farewell tour and left Falling to Pieces.

Breakup
In April 2007 Scott and Bleeding Through parted ways.

Current activities
Danough is currently a member of Mean Season, who are credited as being one of the first hardcore bands to play metal style music but are really just another band who have incorporated that style into their sound like many others long before them. He is also playing guitar for Falling to Pieces, a brutal and heavy female fronted metal band, encompassing black/death/thrash/grind/hardcore elements, located in Livermore, California.

Discography
with Bleeding Through
2000: Demo
2001: Dust to Ashes
2002: Portrait of the Goddess
2003: This is Love, This is Murderous
2006: The Truth

with Falling to Pieces
2009: Awaken the Weak
2011: Memoria in Aeterna

with Liars Cult
2016: Book of Lies EP

External links
Interview with Scott Danough from Lambgoat.com

References

1972 births
21st-century American guitarists
American heavy metal guitarists
Bleeding Through members
Guitarists from California
Living people
People from Orange County, California